Mary Hunter Austin (1868–1934) was an American writer of fiction and non-fiction.

Mary Austin may also refer to:
 Mary V. Austin (1900–1986), Australian community worker and political activist
 Mary Brown Austin (1768–1824), mother of Texan pioneer Stephen F. Austin
 Mary Austin (born 1951), closest friend and former girlfriend of musician Freddie Mercury
 Mary Austin, wife of Brewster Kahle and co-founder of the Kahle/Austin Foundation
 Mary Austin, pseudonym of American science fiction writer Jane Rice
 Mount Mary Austin, mountain in California's Sierra Nevada range

See also
 Mary Austin Holley (1784–1846), historical writer